The Cajamarca Oldfield mouse (Thomasomys praetor) is a species of rodent in the family Cricetidae. It is present in the Andes of northwestern Peru, where its habitats include shrubby páramo, montane forest, and secondary forest. The rodent is nocturnal and may be partly arboreal. It was formerly considered a subspecies of T. aureus. The common name comes from the Peruvian city and region of Cajamarca.

References

Mammals of Peru
Thomasomys
Mammals described in 1900
Páramo fauna
Taxa named by Oldfield Thomas